The Gitchi-Gami State Trail is a multi-use recreational trail in development along the North Shore of Lake Superior in Minnesota, USA.   Planned to extend  from Two Harbors to Grand Marais, the trail currently comprises five unconnected segments.  The route will be situated primarily along state-owned right-of-way for Minnesota State Highway 61, with deviations for greater scenic diversity.  "Gitchi-Gami" is an anglicization of the name for Lake Superior in the Ojibwe language.

Description
The longest completed section runs  from Gooseberry Falls State Park to the town of Beaver Bay, passing through Split Rock Lighthouse State Park on the way.  Another  segment runs from Schroeder to Tofte through Temperance River State Park.  The trail resumes at the other side of Tofte for a  segment that goes to Lutsen.  Lastly there is a  completed segment outside Two Harbors and a  section leading into Grand Marais.  New sections are under construction during the summer of 2011, with others in planning stages.

References

External links
 Gitchi-Gami State Trail
 Gitchi-Gami Trail Association

Hiking trails in Minnesota
Protected areas of Cook County, Minnesota
Protected areas of Lake County, Minnesota
Minnesota state trails